East Petpeswick  is a rural community of the Halifax Regional Municipality in the Canadian province of Nova Scotia on the Eastern Shore.

References
Explore HRM

Communities in Halifax, Nova Scotia
General Service Areas in Nova Scotia